Logo TV (often shortened to Logo, and stylized as Logo.) is an American basic cable channel owned by Paramount Media Networks, a division of Paramount Global. Launched in 2005, Logo was originally dedicated to lifestyle and entertainment programming targeting LGBT audiences. As of January 2016, approximately 50 million households receive Logo.

History 
The channel launched June 30, 2005 as the first advertiser-supported commercial television channel in the United States geared towards the gay community. It was founded by former MTV executive Matt Farber. Its first president, Brian Graden, was named by Out as the 15th most powerful gay person in America in 2007. Logo replaced VH1 MegaHits when it was launched.

The fact that the LGBT-themed channel was named "Logo" led some viewers to think the "l" and the "g" referenced "lesbian" and "gay", but according to company executives, the name does not represent anything, nor is it an acronym. The channel's website says:

Logo struck carriage deals prior to its launch date with DirecTV, Charter Communications, Adelphia Communications Corporation, Cablevision, Time Warner Cable, and RCN Corporation. The broadcaster reached a deal with Comcast after the launch date. Logo has partnered with CBS News to provide news briefs and has developed a relationship with LPI Media, publisher of The Advocate, Out, and Out Traveler magazines. MTV Networks and Time Warner Cable announced an agreement December 11, 2006, to expand its distribution of Logo to additional markets. Logo became available on Dish Network in May 2009 (in HD only) as part of an add-on package.

In April 2011, Logo acquired the rights to air the British comedy series Absolutely Fabulous and co-produced the show's three revival specials during 2011 and 2012 with the BBC and BBC America. Logo aired the episodes in a heavily edited format, while BBC America aired the episodes in its entirety.

The network announced on February 21, 2012, that it would change its programming strategy. Citing research that indicated that LGBT people were becoming increasingly less likely to prioritize highlighting their sexual orientation or identity, the channel entered into partnerships to produce programs that focused less on LGBT-specific interests and more on general cultural and lifestyle subjects.

Day-to-day operations were handled by Lisa Sherman, who was executive vice president and general manager until her resignation in October 2013.

Programming 

Logo's programming was initially a blend of movies, reality television, travel programming, dating & romance shows, documentaries, music videos, stand-up comedy, news, and syndicated programs that either had queer characters or were popular among queer viewers.

Since 2017, the network's main programming serves as a complementary flank to TV Land, airing older sitcoms from the 1970s to 1990s. In line with Viacom's 2017 restructuring plan, the network no longer produces any new programming outside of content for its social media pages. RuPaul's Drag Race moved to sister network VH1 that year, with Logo now only airing reruns and simulcasts of the show and its spinoffs.

Logo also previously operated a collection of websites under the LOGOonline umbrella name. NewNowNext, a pop culture news and trends blog, remains the only active website owned by the network.

See also 

 List of United States cable and satellite television networks

References

External links 
 

2005 establishments in New York City
English-language television stations in the United States
Television channels and stations established in 2005
Cable television in the United States
Television networks in the United States
Paramount Media Networks
LGBT-related television channels